Mets de Guaynabo is a Puerto Rican professional basketball team of the Baloncesto Superior Nacional based in Guaynabo, Puerto Rico. The team dissolved in 2015, but was reinstated with new ownership in 2019.

The team was founded in 1935 as the original Cangrejeros de Santurce based in San Juan, Puerto Rico, one of the first professional clubs in the San Juan Metropolitan Area. In 1976 the franchise relocated to the city of Guaynabo and was renamed as the Mets de Guaynabo. Since 1983 the team's home court is Mario Morales Coliseum, named after famed basketball player Mario Morales, who led the team to its three titles in the 1980s. Beforehand, they had to play at a local gymnasium in Isla Verde, a San Juan area somewhat far from Guaynabo.

The Mets have won three BSN Championships, the last one being in 1989. The Mets last reached the finals in 2021, losing to Capitanes de Arecibo. Prior to that they reached the finals in 1991 and again in 1993, losing both times to the Ponce Lions.

Early history

The Mets were coached by legendary National Team and Olympic Coach Julio Toro and were a force in Puerto Rican basketball during the 1980s. With such players as Fico Lopez, Mario Morales, José Sosa, Earl Brown, Jose Santos, Gustavo Santos, Papiro Leon, Papote Agosto and many more, the Mets won championships in 1980, 1982 and 1989, while reaching the finals in 1981, 1983, and 1985. They reached the playoffs every year during that decade.

The Mets were able to acquire Jose and Gustavo Santos from the Rio Piedras Cardinals whom they had defeated the previous year in the Superior Basketball league semi finals. 5 players for two arguably the largest trade in PR basketball history. The Mets were reborn with the Santos trade and looked to their minor league for future stars Papiro Leon, Fico Lopez, Papote Agosto.
So dominant and young was this team, that a dynasty was born, the Mets reached the finals in 4 consecutive years winning two championships. All of their players were below the age of 25, with teenagers shoring up the bench. The Puerto Rican Basketball Federation had to break up this team by introducing a draft and new rule that a team can only protect "6" players thus breaking up the powerful Mets. Lopez and Morales, who were also brothers in law as Morales married Lopez's sister, famous volleyball player Eva Lopez, formed a formidable duo on the court, with Lopez playing point guard and Morales forward. They became Puerto Rican basketball legends.

Even though the team was not active in the league from 2015 to 2019, many other sports teams in Guaynabo, from baseball to volleyball, have assumed the Mets name.

Return as an expansion team

On November 22, 2019, league officials announced the first expansion team since 1993 would be established in the San Juan area. Owners Marc Grossman and Mark Linder initially eyed Roberto Clemente Coliseum as the home court for their new team, but San Juan's Mayor Carmen Yulin Cruz expressed concerns the team wouldn't be able to play a full season at the venue due to previously scheduled events. Grossman and Linder then decided to revive the Mets de Guaynabo, five years after the original team left Guaynabo.

The team reintroduced themselves on December 17, 2019 in a press conference with Grossman, former Puerto Rico national basketball team general manager Alfredo “Piraña” Morales, Guaynabo Mayor Angel Perez Otero, and BSN President Ricardo Dalmau. During the press conference, team officials revealed the new team, the league's tenth, signed its first free agent, Angel Alamo. Alamo was a 34-year-old forward who had played previously for the Mets in 2012 and 2013. The team also selected four players in an expansion draft on November 22nd, 2019 and received the 11th pick in the January 15, 2020 draft.

Grossman and Linder hired Puerto Rico national basketball team general manager Alfredo “Piraña” Morales to be the Mets' general manager. Prior to the 2020 season, Grossman pursued former NBA All Star Metta World Peace to be the Mets' head coach. The team was also considering former NBA All Star Charles Oakley, Paco Olmos, Allans Colón, and Carlos Calcaño. In December 2019, World Peace held tryouts for the team in Los Angeles, but was not officially named coach.

Isaiah Austin, a former Baylor University basketball star who played professionally for teams in China and Lebanon since 2017, signed with the Mets in December 2019 as one of their three import players allowed as an expansion team.

Team

Current roster

Depth chart

Notable players

 Zach Hankins (born 1996)
 Tu Holloway (born 1989)
Ben Moore (born 1995)

References

External links
 Official website

BSN teams